Charles de Souza (date of birth not known) was a Ugandan first-class cricketer.

The son of Deoniz de Souza, he was born in Uganda Protectorate. A figure in Ugandan cricket since 1952 and considered the best Ugandan all-rounder of the time, he made a single appearance in first-class cricket for an East African Invitation XI against the touring Marylebone Cricket Club at Kampala in November 1963. Batting twice in the match from the lower order, he was dismissed for without scoring in the East African first innings by David Larter, while in their second innings he was dismissed for 22 runs by Jeff Jones. With the ball, he took the wicket of Tom Cartwright to finish with match figures of 1 for 75. He played minor matches for Uganda from 1953 to 1970, captaining the side in what would be his final match against Zambia. In 1972, he had once again been named in the Uganda squad for their upcoming internationals, but as an Asian-Ugandan he was expelled from Uganda by Idi Amin in the same year and thus never appeared again for Uganda.

References

External links

Date of birth unknown
Possibly living people
Ugandan people of Indian descent
Ugandan cricketers
East African cricketers